Thunder is a fictional character appearing in American comic books published by DC Comics. The character was created by writer Judd Winick and artist Tom Raney in the Modern Age of Comic Books. She is first mentioned in Green Arrow (vol. 2) #26 (July 2003) and first appears a month later in Outsiders (vol. 3) #1. Born Anissa Pierce, she is a metahuman and daughter of superhero Black Lightning, able to increase her physical density and durability and create massive shockwaves.

Pierce is also the older sister of Jennifer, herself a superhero operating under the alias Lightning. Against her parents' wishes, Anissa chooses to utilize her abilities to fight crime. She is invited and accepts a position with the superhero team the Outsiders. Pierce is involved in a relationship with her teammate Grace Choi.

Along with her presence in various comic books Thunder has made appearances on a number of television shows and appeared in the live action Arrowverse series Black Lightning, portrayed by Nafessa Williams.

Fictional character biography

Daughter of Black Lightning
Although it is not clear but one assumes she got her powers genetically from her father who is also a metahuman. Her father Jefferson Pierce (Black Lightning) and her mother Lynn Stewart did not want her following in his footsteps, and he struck a bargain with her: she would graduate from college before considering a career in crimefighting. She did, and the same night of her graduation she donned a costume and became Thunder. She is also the older sister of Lightning.

Outsiders

Shortly after Thunder had started her solo career, she was approached by Arsenal, who offered her a spot on the new team of Outsiders. Reasoning that she could best learn the superhero trade with a team, she agreed to this offer and became an Outsider. Although she got along with most of her teammates, she seemed to come into conflict with Grace, a tough promiscuous bouncer, constantly. They were however quite effective as a team, and the two slowly came to a grudging respect between them; later on they became lovers.

Eventually her father appeared at the Outsiders headquarters, demanding her resignation from the team. Naturally, she refused and when the danger of Sabbac arose again, her father even decided to accompany the Outsiders. During that adventure, the two came to respect each other's abilities, neither having seen the other in action before, and Thunder was allowed to remain an Outsider.

The extent of her invulnerability was tested during a fight with the re-formed Fearsome Five. The matter transmuter Shimmer converted the air in her lungs to water, which caused an inflammation so great that she had pulmonary edema and Acute respiratory distress syndrome, which nearly killed her. She recovered and continued to serve with the Outsiders.

"One Year Later"

OYL, Anissa remains a member of the Outsiders (a team that was currently believed to be dead), and has been involved in the attempted toppling of the regime of Mali. Her role has been instrumental in the mission, having gone undercover amongst the government, a role that has required her to pretend she was having a sexual relationship with the country's ruler Ratun Bennin; in actuality Metamorpho used a hallucinogenic compound to fool the dictator. She compromised the team's mission when she revealed her cover and attacked Mali's army, who were going to slaughter a village.

It was revealed that Thunder has been in a romantic relationship with her teammate Grace, making her one of a handful of LGBT people of color in the DC roster. Thunder was recently kicked off The Outsiders upon Batman's reorganization of the team, being replaced by the Martian Manhunter. She rejoined the team, when Grace invited her on a mission, without Batman's approval.

During the Batman R.I.P. events an assembly of the Outsiders, including Anissa, receives a message from the missing Batman, asking them to feed a secret code in the cybernetic mind of the ReMAC, allowing him to track the Caped Crusader and the Black Glove and help him into his fight. As they reluctantly comply, due to Batgirl, the code reveals itself as a cybernetic boobytrap set by Doctor Hurt, the mastermind behind Batman's downfall, and ReMAC explodes. Several Outsiders are wounded, and Anissa sustains brain injuries severe enough to knock her in a seemingly irreversible coma. However her in-costume appearance in the "Final Crisis: Submit" story suggest she recovered afterwards, as the Final Crisis storyline occurs after the events in R.I.P., though Thunder is still shown in a coma during the Batman and the Outsiders Special, where her father ultimately joins up with a new roster of Outsiders to take her place.

Thunder eventually reappears many months later, now living with Grace in a state of semi-retirement. The inconsistencies regarding her coma are briefly touched upon when it is explained that Anissa had been "in and out of hospitals" for a prolonged period after her initial injuries. Following a botched mission, Black Lightning arrives at Anissa and Grace's apartment with several other fugitive members of the new Outsiders, telling Anissa that he simply wishes to see his children again after spending months without any contact with his family. He briefly expresses discomfort over his daughter's sexual orientation, but Anissa tells him off by stating that Grace was there for her when he wasn't. When the Justice Society of America attacks the apartment to bring the Outsiders into custody, Anissa chooses to side with her father and fight off the attacking heroes, which ultimately leads to a confrontation with her younger sister, Lightning, whom she claims was always thought of as the "favorite". After the fight is broken up by Doctor Fate, Anissa and Grace choose to rejoin the Outsiders on a mission to Markovia, where Amanda Waller tasked them with capturing Geo-Force.<ref>Outsiders (vol. 4) #36</ref>

Powers and abilities
Thunder has the ability to increase her body's mass while preserving volume, which effectively increases her density. In this state she is near-immovable, almost completely invulnerable. A mob enforcer once suffered a compound fracture after trying to punch Thunder in the face. Notably, she can make her skin strong enough to withstand bullets. Just by stomping the ground she can create massive shockwaves.

Other versions
Kingdom Come
In an alternate universe depicted in Kingdom Come, a young boy who inherited his father's powers and became the new owner of Thunderbolt operates as Thunder.

In other media
Television
 A teenage Thunder appears in the "Thunder and Lightning" segment of DC Nation Shorts, voiced by Cree Summer.
 Anissa Pierce appears in Black Lightning, portrayed by Nafessa Williams. This version's powers are activated by holding her breath. After being kidnapped by the 100 and rescued by her father Black Lightning, Anissa's powers begin to emerge. She later receives a suit from Peter Gambi, joins her father in crime-fighting as Thunder, and goes on to fall in love with and eventually get engaged to marry Grace Choi. Later in the series, Anissa adopts the alias Blackbird to operate as an independent vigilante in response to the A.S.A.'s oppression.
 Additionally, Williams makes cameo appearances as two alternate universe versions of Anissa in the episode "The Book of Resistance: Chapter Four: Earth Crisis". 
 A young Anissa Pierce makes cameo appearances in Young Justice: Outsiders, voiced by Masasa Moyo.

Miscellaneous
A teenage Thunder appears in DC Super Hero Girls'', voiced again by Cree Summer.

References

External links
 DCU Guide: Thunder III

Female characters in television
DC Comics characters with superhuman strength
DC Comics female superheroes
DC Comics metahumans
African-American superheroes
DC Comics LGBT superheroes
Fictional characters with density control abilities
Fictional African-American people
Fictional lesbians
Fictional LGBT characters in television
Comics characters introduced in 2003
Characters created by Judd Winick